Siq'i (Quechua for scratch, Hispanicized spelling Sique) is a  mountain in the Cordillera Central in the Andes of Peru. It is located in the Lima Region, Yauyos Province, in the districts of Huantan and Laraos. It lies between two groups of lakes northeast of Awki Sunqu and Chuntani and southeast of Misitu.

References

Mountains of Peru
Mountains of Lima Region